Mrs. B. F. Williamson House, also known as the Williamson-Wilson House, is a historic home located at Darlington, Darlington County, South Carolina.  It was built about 1898, and is a two-story, frame Queen Anne style dwelling. It has shiplap siding, a high complex roof, and tall interior chimneys. It features a wraparound porch with hip roof and turned posts.   Also on the property is an original servant's cottage.

It was listed on the National Register of Historic Places in 1988.

References

Houses on the National Register of Historic Places in South Carolina
Queen Anne architecture in South Carolina
Houses completed in 1898
Houses in Darlington County, South Carolina
National Register of Historic Places in Darlington County, South Carolina
Darlington, South Carolina